The twelfth season of The Real Housewives of New York City, an American reality television series, is broadcast on Bravo. It premiered on April 2, 2020. The series is primarily filmed in New York City. Its executive producers are  Lisa Shannon, Barrie Bernstein, Darren Ward John Paparazzo and Andy Cohen. The season focuses on the lives of Luann de Lesseps, Ramona Singer, Sonja Morgan, Dorinda Medley, Tinsley Mortimer and Leah McSweeney.

Cast and synopsis
Following the completion of production on the eleventh season, Bethenny Frankel announced her departure from the series. 

In November 2019, Luann de Lesseps stated on Watch What Happens Live with Andy Cohen, that Leah McSweeney would be the newest addition to the show. The season also includes Elyse Slaine who appears in a recurring capacity. On June 11, 2020, Tinsley Mortimer announced her exit from the series midseason, following her decision to relocate to Chicago to be with fiancé Scott Kluth. Following the conclusion of the episode, the series went on a two-week hiatus, allowing editors additional time to edit episodes, due to the COVID-19 pandemic in the United States. On June 29 of the same year, it was announced that upon the season's return, new tag lines would be used, a first in the franchise's history.

In August 2020, Medley announced her departure from the series. That same month, the season's three-part reunion was filmed—in-person—on Long Island at the Oheka Castle, becoming the first Real Housewives reunion to be filmed face-to-face since the COVID-19 pandemic in the United States.

Episodes

References

External links
 

2020 American television seasons
New York City (season 12)